Ryan McHugh (born 11 April 1994) is an Irish Gaelic footballer who plays for Cill Chartha and the Donegal county team. He is the brother of Mark and the son of Martin.

A former county minor, McHugh propelled himself onto the national stage in 2014 with a 2–2 blitz of reigning All-Ireland champions Dublin in their live televised semi-final meeting at Croke Park.

Early life and family
McHugh was reared in Bavin, in south-west Donegal. He is the son of Patrice and the brother of Rachel.

He is also the son of Martin, the BBC television analyst and 1992 All-Ireland Senior Football Championship winner. His son Mark, Ryan's older brother, is also an All-Ireland SFC winner with Donegal. Ryan McHugh's uncle James also played in the 1992 All-Ireland Final and received an All Star in 1992. His cousin Eoin is James's son.

Playing career

Club
With his club Cill Chartha, McHugh won the 2012 Donegal Minor Football Championship as team captain. He scored one point in the final.

He also won the 2017 Donegal Senior Football Championship, scoring a point in the final. It was the first time his club had won the title in 24 years, having been defeated by Glenswilly at the same stage the previous year.

Inter-county

Underage
McHugh won an All-Ireland Vocational Schools Championship and captained the 2012 Donegal minor team.

He played in the under-21 team that lost to Cavan in the 2013 Ulster final, though had been troubled by a calf injury beforehand.

He also played on the under-21 team that lost to Cavan in the 2014 Ulster final.

He played in the 2015 Ulster Under-21 Football Championship final loss to Tyrone.

Jim McGuinness: 2012–14
Jim McGuinness drafted McHugh into his senior squad ahead of the 2013 season, with Donegal the defending All-Ireland champions. Colm Keys of the Irish Independent named him as the third of his "ten young guns aiming to fire in the league" ahead of the 2013 National Football League.

McHugh made his senior competitive debut in a home game against Down in the 2013 National Football League on 9 February 2013. He made his senior championship debut against Down as well later that year in June. Photographs of him appeared in the media the following day.

McHugh won his first Ulster Senior Football Championship in 2014, scoring one point as Donegal defeated Monaghan in the final.

McHugh propelled himself onto the national stage with a 2–2 blitz of All-Ireland champions Dublin in the 2014 semi-final meeting at Croke Park on 31 August. Man of the match in that game, McHugh described himself as "fortunate" to have scored his two goals. His brother Mark left him to the bus that morning, then sat by "and watched as [Ryan McHugh] became a household name in one afternoon". Donegal qualified for the 2014 All-Ireland Senior Football Championship Final but lost to Kerry by a single score, with Colm McFadden striking the goalpost to the left of goalkeeper Brian Kelly in the third minute of stoppage time. In October 2014, McHugh was named as that year's All Stars Young Footballer of the Year.

Bonner–McGuinness interim: 2014–17
Under the management of McGuinness's Rory Gallagher, McHugh started the opening fixture of the 2015 National Football League at home to Derry. He also started the next game against Dublin at Croke Park, the third fixture against Cork in Ballyshannon and the fourth fixture against Monaghan. He started the fifth fixture against Kerry at Austin Stack Park and scored a goal. He started the sixth fixture against Tyrone and scored 1–1. He also started the seventh fixture against Mayo. Donegal qualified for the NFL semi-final. McHugh also started and completed this game but was held scoreless.

McHugh started the 2015 Ulster Senior Football Championship final. He had previously started the preliminary round against Tyrone, the quarter-final against Armagh and the semi-final against Derry. McHugh scored an important goal in the 2015 All-Ireland Senior Football Championship qualifier defeat of Galway at Croke Park and started the next game against Mayo at the same venue.

McHugh started the opening fixture of the 2016 National Football League away to Down and scored 2–0. He then started the second fixture against Cork, a ten-point win in Ballyshannon. He started the third fixture against Mayo and scored 0–2. He started the fourth fixture, away to Kerry at Austin Stack Park. He started the fifth fixture against Roscommon and scored 0–1. He also started the sixth and seventh fixtures, away to Dublin at Croke Park and Monaghan in Castleblayney respectively. Donegal qualified for the NFL semi-final. McHugh started this game too.

McHugh started the 2016 Ulster Senior Football Championship final, scoring 0–3. He had previously started the quarter-final against Fermanagh, the semi-final against Monaghan and the semi-final replay against the same opposition. McHugh scored 0–3 in the 2016 All-Ireland Senior Football Championship qualifier defeat of Cork at Croke Park. He then scored yet another goal against reigning All-Ireland SFC champions Dublin in the next game, at the same venue. His performances during the 2016 season earned him an All Star, the county's 32nd.

McHugh started the opening fixture of the 2017 National Football League against Kerry and scored 0–1. He then started the second fixture away to Roscommon. He scored another goal against Dublin in the third round of fixtures. He started the fourth fixture against Cavan and scored 0–1. He started the fifth fixture against Tyrone and scored 0–2. He also started the sixth fixture against Monaghan.

McHugh started the 2017 Ulster Senior Football Championship quarter-final victory against Antrim (scoring 0–1) and the semi-final loss to Tyrone. He started the 2017 All-Ireland Senior Football Championship qualifier defeat of Meath at Páirc Tailteann and scored a goal. He then started the qualifier loss to Galway at Markievicz Park.

Declan Bonner: 2017–
Under the management of Declan Bonner, McHugh started for Donegal in the opening fixture of the 2018 National Football League against Kerry in Killarney. He scored a point in the next game against Galway. He scored 0–3 in the third game against Dublin and 1–2 in the fourth game against Kildare. He started against Tyrone and Monaghan in the fifth and sixth games, though was not part of the seventh game against Mayo.

McHugh started the final and scored a goal as Donegal secured the 2018 Ulster Senior Football Championship. He had previously started the preliminary round against Cavan (scoring a goal), the quarter-final against Derry (scoring 0–2) and the semi-final against Down (again scoring 0–2).

On 26 September 2018, however, it was announced that McHugh had accepted medical advice and would be sidelined for the remainder of the year due to concussion. His injury came while playing for his club in a challenge match against Dublin champions St Vincents in Cavan in late August 2018 — he received a blow to the head during that match. Concussion had also caused McHugh to spend six weeks on the sideline following a 2018 National Football League game (against Kildare or Tyrone depending on which report you read) earlier that year. The injury meant he could take no part in the 2018 Donegal Senior Football Championship (of which his club were the defending champions), news which was worsened when taken in the context of the earlier loss of McHugh's club and county teammate Patrick McBrearty to a cruciate ligament injury. McHugh won a second All-Star at the end of the season. This remarkable achievement was further contextualized when McHugh later revealed he had suffered a "a slight bleed" in his brain and two concussions in seven months during that season.

McHugh started against Clare in the opening fixture of the 2019 National Football League in Ennis. He also started the next fixtures against Meath, Tipperary, Fermanagh and Armagh. He started and scored two points in the sixth fixture against Cork. He started the seventh fixture against Kildare and scored three points. Donegal qualified for the National Football League Division 2 final and McHugh started the game as Donegal defeated Meath to win the title.

McHugh won his third Ulster SFC in 2019, scoring one point as Donegal defeated Cavan in the final. He had previously started the quarter-final against Fermanagh and the semi-final against Tyrone (scoring 0–1 in the latter game).

McHugh started each of Donegal's first five fixtures of the 2020 National Football League against Mayo, Meath, Galway, Dublin and Monaghan, though he scored only once (against Mayo in the opening game). Then the COVID-19 pandemic brought play to a halt. Play resumed behind closed doors on 18 October with a home game against Tyrone; McHugh started that game and scored three points. He did not participate in the concluding game of the league campaign (away to Kerry) as he and other senior players (such as Michael Murphy, Hugh McFadden and Eoghan Bán Gallagher) were rested ahead of the 2020 Ulster Senior Football Championship quarter-final against Tyrone the following Sunday. McHugh started and completed that opening victory against Tyrone, though he did not score. He also started the semi-final victory against Armagh, scoring two points. McHugh made his hundredth appearance for Donegal against Cavan in the 2020 Ulster SFC final. He scored a point in what proved to be the season's concluding game for his team.

McHugh started in the half-back line in each of Donegal's four fixtures of the 2021 National Football League (against Tyrone, Monaghan, Armagh and Dublin), completing all four and scoring a point against Armagh.

In the 2021 Ulster Senior Football Championship, he started each of Donegal's three fixtures and scored four points against Down in the opening round but was held scoreless against Derry in the quarter-final and against Tyrone in the semi-final.

McHugh started each of Donegal's fixtures of the 2022 National Football League, against Mayo, Kildare, Kerry, Tyrone, Monaghan, Dublin and Armagh. He scored a point against Mayo, followed by a goal and a point in the second fixture against Kildare. He did not score in the third fixture, away to Kerry. He scored a point against Tyrone in the fourth fixture but failed to score again in the next game, a loss to Monaghan. He then scored a point away to Dublin in the penultimate fixture, before being held scoreless in the win against Armagh at O'Donnell Park.

In the 2022 Ulster Senior Football Championship, McHugh started each of Donegal's three fixtures but was held scoreless in two of them, the quarter-final against Armagh and the semi-final against Cavan. He scored one point in the final against Derry but his team lost that game after extra-time. He also started the 2022 All-Ireland Senior Football Championship qualifier loss to Armagh, scoring a point.

Player profile
McHugh's footballing intelligence is equivalent to that of Peter Canavan and his instincts are similar to Maurice Fitzgerald. He is possessed of a low centre of gravity and a slight physical frame. With an excellent positional sense, he dips his shoulders to set off on a run. Over 30 metres he can accelerate his pace. His mannerisms and temperament are more similar to his father than the other McHughs. Though he plays in the half-back line, he is often a goalscorer.

McHugh has been likened to a child of school-going age — "You'd think he had just stepped off a school bus", Benny Tierney, the GAA pundit, once said. His former county manager Jim McGuinness has suggested: "Even when the big hits are going in, Ryan has the ability to summon that little shimmy that helps to take him past defenders and allows him to set up colleagues." Ciarán Kilkenny is another admirer.

Other activities

English Football League Championship
McHugh, though from a football family, often used to play a bit of soccer with St Catherine's "as a distraction". A scout for the professional English league side Reading spotted him at the age of 16 and McHugh was invited to England for a trial. However, after playing several games, McHugh decided he would prefer to return to football so off he went, back home. That Reading team, then managed by Brian McDermott, were one year away from promotion to the Premier League.

Peil Star video
In 2016, Ryan appeared in a street Gaelic football film created by Peil Star with Kieran Hughes (Monaghan), Richie Donnelly (Tyrone) and Niall McKeever (Antrim). The film was shot at Belfast's Titanic Quarter.

Personal life
As of 2020, Ryan McHugh was working at Ocean Knowledge, a fertiliser company, in Kilcar. Ocean Knowledge employs him in the role of business development manager. His cousin Eoin also works there. The McHugh cousins often play golf together.

As of 2021, McHugh was sharing an apartment with his partner Bridget Molloy. He has had a girlfriend since at least 2016. He has supported Arsenal since childhood.

Career statistics

Honours
Donegal
 All-Ireland Senior Football Championship runner-up: 2014
 Ulster Senior Football Championship: 2014, 2018, 2019
 National Football League Division 2: 2019
 Ulster Under-21 Football Championship runner-up: 2013, 2014, 2015
 Ulster MFL Shield: 2011
 All-Ireland Vocational Schools Championship: 2011

Cill Chartha
 Donegal Senior Football Championship: 2017
 Donegal Senior Football League Division 1: 2014, 2016, 2017, 2019
 Donegal Under-21 Football Championship: 2011, 2013, 2015
 Donegal Minor Football Championship: 2012 (c.)

Individual
 All Stars Young Footballer of the Year: 2014
 All Star: 2016, 2018
Nominated in 2014, 2015, 2016, 2018, 2019
 Irish News Player of the Year: 2014
 Irish News Team of the Year: 2014, 2015, 2016, 2018, 2019

References

External links
 

1994 births
Living people
Donegal inter-county Gaelic footballers
Gaelic footballers who switched code
Gaelic football forwards
Ryan
Kilcar Gaelic footballers
People from Kilcar
St Catherine's F.C. players
Association footballers not categorized by position
Republic of Ireland association footballers